Waterfront station is a major intermodal public transportation facility and the main transit terminus in Vancouver, British Columbia, Canada. It is located on West Cordova Street in Downtown Vancouver, between Granville and Seymour Street. The station is also accessible via two other street-level entrances, one on Howe Street to the west for direct access to the Expo Line and another on Granville Street to the south for direct access to the Canada Line.

The station is within walking distance of Vancouver's historical Gastown district, Canada Place, Vancouver Convention Centre, Harbour Centre, Sinclair Centre, and the Vancouver Harbour Flight Centre float plane terminal. A heliport operated by Helijet, along with the downtown campuses for Simon Fraser University and the British Columbia Institute of Technology, are also located within the vicinity of the station.

History

Waterfront station was built by the Canadian Pacific Railway (CPR) and opened on August 1, 1914. It was the Pacific terminus for the CPR's transcontinental passenger trains to Montreal, Quebec, and Toronto, Ontario. The current station is the third CPR station. The previous CPR station was located one block west, at the foot of Granville and, unlike the current classical-styled Waterfront station, was built in "railway gothic" like the CPR's many railway hotels.

In 1978, when Via Rail took over the passenger operations of the CPR and the Canadian National Railway, it continued using both railways' stations in Vancouver, but a year later, Via consolidated its Vancouver operations at Pacific Central Station, the CN station near False Creek, and ceased using the CPR station. The last scheduled Via passenger train to use Waterfront station departed on October 27, 1979.

Waterfront station's transformation into a public intermodal transit facility began in 1977. That year, the SeaBus began operating out of a purpose-built floating pier that was connected to the main terminal building via an overhead walkway above the CPR tracks. The CPR's passenger platform and some of its tracks were torn up in the early 1980s to make way for the guideway of the original SkyTrain line (Expo Line), which opened on December 11, 1985. During Expo 86, SkyTrain operated special shuttle trains between Waterfront station and Stadium–Chinatown station (then named Stadium station), connecting the Canadian Pavilion at Canada Place to the main Expo site along False Creek.

A private ferry company, Royal SeaLink Express, ran passenger ferries from a new dock on the west side of the SeaBus terminal to Victoria and Nanaimo in the early 1990s, but ultimately folded. In 2003, HarbourLynx began operating out of Royal Sealink's old facility at the SeaBus terminal. In 2006, following major engine problems with their only vessel, they folded as well.

In 1995, platforms were built adjacent to the SkyTrain station for the West Coast Express, which uses the existing CPR tracks. The platforms for the West Coast Express were built in the same location as the old CPR platforms.

In 2002, Millennium Line trains began to share tracks with the Expo Line at Waterfront station. The lines continued to share tracks until late 2016, when an Expo Line branch to Production Way–University station was created in replacement of the Millennium Line service between VCC–Clark and Waterfront stations.

In 2009, the Canada Line opened with separate platforms which are accessible via the main station building, but require leaving the fare-paid zone when transferring between other modes. Waterfront station serves as a common terminus point for both the Expo Line and the Canada Line.

Waterfront station was one of the first stations to receive TransLink's "T" signage, denoting a transit station. This signage was originally installed in the downtown core of Vancouver to help visitors during the 2010 Olympics.

In 2018, TransLink announced that Waterfront's Canada Line platforms, as well as two other stations on the line within downtown Vancouver, would receive an accessibility upgrade including additional escalators, as most Canada Line stations were built with only up-escalators initially. Construction began in early 2019 and was completed in December.

In 2020, TransLink started work on replacing the escalators connecting to the Expo Line. The first step in this project was to close access to the Expo Line from Cordova Street for three weeks in June. The closure forced passengers to access the Expo Line from the Howe Street entrance. Because the construction blocked access to the elevators to the Expo Line platforms, a temporary shuttle bus service between the SeaBus terminal, the main concourse area, and Burrard station was instated.

In 2022, TransLink relocated the in-person service centre at Stadium–Chinatown station and opened a new  customer service centre at Waterfront station on September 23.

Architecture

Waterfront's main station building was designed in a neoclassical style, with a symmetrical red-brick facade dominated by a row of smooth, white Ionic order columns. The Ionic columns are repeated in the grand interior hall, flanking the perimeter of the space. The main hall features two large clocks facing each other high on the east and west walls. Paintings depicting various scenic Canadian landscapes, completed in 1916 by Adelaide Langford, line the walls above the columns. The Montreal architecture firm Barott, Blackader and Webster was responsible for designing the main station building.

Services
SkyTrain Expo Line through Vancouver to northeast/south Burnaby, New Westminster and Surrey
SkyTrain Canada Line, through Vancouver to central Richmond and Vancouver International Airport
West Coast Express commuter rail Port Moody, Coquitlam, Port Coquitlam, Pitt Meadows, Maple Ridge, and Mission
SeaBus passenger ferry to Lonsdale Quay in North Vancouver
Various local, suburban, and express bus services provided by TransLink
HeliJet's heliport is adjacent to the SeaBus concourse, therefore allowing passengers to connect to Waterfront station's main terminal building
Vancouver Harbour Flight Centre float plane terminal is located approximately two blocks west of Canada Place

Station information

Station layout

Entrances
 Cordova Street entrance (terminal building) : a fully accessible entrance connecting all services at Waterfront station. The entrance is located at the east end of platforms 1 and 2 (Expo Line) and north end of platform 3 and 4 (Canada Line).
 Howe Street entrance: serves Canada Place, with underground connection to Sinclair Centre and Waterfront Centre at concourse level. No elevator is available at this entrance.
 Granville Street entrance : a new entrance opened 2009 in conjunction to the opening of the Canada Line. Located at the south end of platform 3 and 4 (Canada Line).

Transit connections

Bus services load on Cordova Street. Additional stops are located on Hastings Street, adjacent to the Canada Line entrance near Granville Street for the R5 RapidBus service.

See also
List of heritage buildings in Vancouver
Pan Pacific Vancouver Hotel
Fairmont Pacific Rim

References

External links

Buildings and structures in Vancouver
Heritage buildings in Vancouver
Canadian Pacific Railway stations in British Columbia
SeaBus
Expo Line (SkyTrain) stations
Canada Line stations
West Coast Express stations
Transport in Greater Vancouver
Transit centers
Ferry terminals in British Columbia
1914 establishments in British Columbia
Railway stations in Canada opened in 1914
Railway stations in Canada opened in 2009